Hazara culture or Hazaragi culture refers to the culture and tradition of the Hazara people, who live primarily in the Hazarajat region of central Afghanistan, the Balochistan province of Pakistan, and elsewhere around the world where the Hazara diaspora is settled as part of the wider Afghan diaspora.

The culture of the Hazara people is rich in heritage, with many unique cultures and traditions, and shares influences with various Central Asian and South Asian cultures. The Hazarajat region has an ancient history and was, at different periods, home to the Greco-Buddhist, Ghorids and Ghaznavids civilizations, later the Mongols and Timurid dynasties. Each of these civilizations left visible imprints on the region's local culture. According to genetic evidence, the ethnic group has both "paternal and maternal relations" to Turkic peoples and the Mongols, and at the same time is also related to neighboring Iranian peoples thus making them a distinct ethnic group.

The Hazara native language Hazaragi is a dialect of the Persian language, which is spoken mostly in Afghanistan. The Hazara were traditionally pastoral farmers active in herding in the central and southeastern highlands of Afghanistan. They primarily practice Islam, denominations of Shia Islam with significance of Sunni Islam, and some Isma'ili and Non-denominational Muslim minorities.

Clothing 

Hazara clothing plays an important and special role in supporting the traditional, cultural and social identity of Hazaras. Hazara clothes are sewn in most parts of the country, especially in the central provinces of the country.

Cuisine 

Hazara cuisine is strongly influenced by the Central Asian, South Asian and Persian cuisines.

Music

Dambura 

Many Hazara musicians are highly skilled in playing the dambura, a local oud instrument found in other Central Asian countries such as Kazakhstan, Uzbekistan and Tajikistan. Some of the musicians and dambura players are, such as Sarwar Sarkhosh, Dawood Sarkhosh, Safdar Tawakoli, Sayed Anwar Azad and others.

Sport

Buzkashi 

Buzkashi is a Central Asian sport in which horse-mounted players attempt to place a goat or calf carcass in a goal.
It is the national sport in Afghanistan and is one of the main cultural sports of the Hazara people.

Pehlwani

Games 
 Tirandazi

Gallery

See also 
 Culture of Afghanistan

References

 
Central Asian culture
South Asian culture
Hazarajat